Epipregnanolone, also known as 3β-hydroxy-5β-pregnan-20-one, 3β,5β-tetrahydroprogesterone, or 3β,5β-THP, is an endogenous neurosteroid. It acts as a negative allosteric modulator of the GABAA receptor and reverses the effects of potentiators like allopregnanolone. Epipregnanolone is biosynthesized from progesterone by the actions of 5β-reductase and 3β-hydroxysteroid dehydrogenase, with 5β-dihydroprogesterone as the intermediate in this two-step transformation.

Epipregnanolone is not a progestogen itself, but via metabolization into other steroids, behaves indirectly as one.

The sulfate of epipreganolone, epipregnanolone sulfate, is a negative allosteric modulator of the NMDA and GABAA receptors and also acts as a TRPM3 channel activator.

Chemistry

See also
 Isopregnanolone
 3β-Dihydroprogesterone
 Pregnanolone
 5α-Dihydroprogesterone
 3β-Androstanediol

References

5β-Pregnanes
GABAA receptor negative allosteric modulators
Neurosteroids
Pregnanes